| name                    = Taibah International School
 | location                = Entebbe Roadnear Kampala
 | country                 = Uganda
 | coordinates             = 
 | authority               = 
 | established             = 2000
 | head_label              = Head Teacher
 | head                    = Annet Nanyonjo
 | faculty                 = 
 | enrollment              = 
 | enrollment_as_of        = 
 | type                    = 
 | denomination            = Non-denominational
 | gender                  = Coeducational
 | system                  = [[Education in Uganda|Ugandan and IGCSE Cambridge
 | nickname                = TIS
 | free_label              = 
 | free_text               = 
 | footnotes               = 
 | homepage                = www.tis.ac.ug

References

External links 
Official site

Boarding schools in Uganda
Educational institutions established in 2000
2000 establishments in Uganda